The British Junior Open 2017 is the edition of the 2017's British Junior Open Squash, which is a World Junior Squash Circuit Tier 2 event. The event took place in Sheffield in England from 2 to 6 January.

Draw and results

Under 19

Boys Under 19

Girls Under 19

Under 17

Boys Under 17

Girls Under 15

See also
 British Junior Open
 World Junior Squash Circuit

References

External links
 British Junior Open 2016 SquashSite website

British Junior Open Squash
British Junior Open
British Junior Open
British Junior Open Squash
Squash in England
2010s in Sheffield
Sports competitions in Sheffield